The Identity and Democracy Party, abbreviated to ID Party and formerly known as the Movement for a Europe of Nations and Freedom (MENF), is an alliance of nationalist, right-wing populist and eurosceptic European political parties founded in 2014. The party has been described as both right-wing and far-right. Its political group in the European Parliament was Europe of Nations and Freedom, which was succeeded in 2019 by Identity and Democracy.

History
In the aftermath of the 2014 European Parliament election, parties affiliated with the European Alliance for Freedom unsuccessfully attempted to form a political group of the European Parliament. After unsuccessfully forming a group, National Rally, Northern League, Freedom Party of Austria, Vlaams Belang and the Civic Conservative Party formed MENF.

Later in 2014, they decided to create a new European-level structure, which became the Movement for a Europe of Nations and Freedom. The Dutch Party for Freedom (PVV) chose not to participate in this pan-European party, as it declined to be funded by the European Union. The Polish Congress of the New Right (KNP), initially claimed that it would be part of the new alliance, but was accused in a press release by the French National Rally of spreading false claims in the Polish and Austrian media. Ultimately the KNP took part in the creation of the party's new parliamentary group as its former leader Janusz Korwin-Mikke was evicted from the party to be replaced by Michal Marusik.

It was recognised by the European Parliament (EP) in 2015. Its maximum grant by the EP for this year is €1,170,746 plus €621,677 for its affiliated political foundation, the Fondation pour une Europe des Nations et des Libertés.

On 16 June 2015, the Europe of Nations and Freedom parliamentary group was created in the European Parliament with members of the MENF (RN, FPÖ, LN, VB) as well as the PVV, Poland's KNP and a former member of UKIP, Janice Atkinson.

The 1st congress of the movement was held on 28 June 2015 in Perpignan, France gathering some MEPs from the National Rally as well as a few of its local & national representatives members; the objective of this meeting was mainly about making the 1st year of action of the National Rally's MEPs in review.

On 15 September 2015, the Flemish Vlaams Belang (VB) and the movement organised a colloquium dealing with sovereignty which took place in the Flemish Parliament with VB's leader Tom Van Grieken, MEP Gerolf Annemans, VB's member Barbara Pas and National Rally's leader Marine Le Pen. All of the Flemish parties approved Marine Le Pen's visit at the Flemish Parliament although the speaker of the Flemish Parliament Jan Peumans (N-VA) decided not to be part of this colloquium.

On 21 November 2015, MENF's think thank "Foundation for a Europe of Nations and Freedom" organised a colloquium ("L'euro, un échec inéluctable?") dealing with Euro and how it might be an inescapable failure. Jacques Sapir took part in this colloquium among others. The FENF, chaired by Gerolf Annemans, organised another colloquium on 2 April 2016 in Paris dealing with union representation and the development of professional organisations in France.

The third colloquium of the movement took place on 4 March 2016 in the Flemish Parliament with VB's leader Tom Van Grieken and PVV's leader Geert Wilders. This colloquium entitled "Freedom" ("Vrijheid") dealt with liberties in Europe and how they would be threatened by immigration from "countries with cultures which are fundamentally different [from the European one]".

The movement's member parties and allies met in July 2016 in Vienna, an event hosted by Austria's FPÖ. The French National Rally, Matteo Salvini's Northern League, the AfD, Belgium's Vlaams Belang, the Dutch Party for Freedom were present among other independent politicians and smaller European parties.

According to Politico, the movement owed in 2016 the European Parliament €535,818. The reasons given by Politico were the forbidden use of European grants by the MENF party to finance national political parties and referendum campaigns. The party strongly denied these allegations by saying that they just had to give the unused EU funds back to the European Parliament.

In 2019 the party expanded by including the Estonian Conservative People's Party in February, We Are Family in March and the League in September. After the 2019 European Parliament election the party re-branded to the Identity and Democracy Party as the European political party for the Identity and Democracy Group in the Ninth European Parliament. In July 2020 the Portuguese nationalist party, Chega joined.

Platform
The ID Party's platform is based around building a Europe that is united, rejecting the complete dismantling of the European Union, however is critical of the current activities of the European Union which it accuses of being ultra-liberal and too bureaucratic. The party platform wishes to build a Europe that is composed of nations that maintain their sovereignty and identity.

Composition

The following national delegations are part of the ID Party:

Relations with other parties 
The national conservative Civic Conservative Party was a founding member of the Movement for a Europe of Nations and Freedom however left the group in 2016.

In February 2016, FPÖ's leader Heinz-Christian Strache was invited by the anti-Euro & anti-immigration party AfD and its leader Frauke Petry to their congress in Düsseldorf and the AfD also announced a cooperation pact with the FPÖ. In April 2016, AfD's vice-president Alexander Gauland also proposed an alliance with Marine Le Pen's National Rally. Therefore, AfD's MEP Marcus Pretzell joined the Europe of Nations and Freedom group on 30 April 2016. The AfD are member of the ID Party's European Parliament political group, Identity and Democracy. The Danish People's Party (DPP) and the Finns Party are also members of the Identity and Democracy political group, and the DPP has participated in ID Party events such as their 2019 Antwerp Conference.

The Dutch Party for Freedom (PVV), despite not being a member of MENF, participated in its previous political group in the European Parliament, ENF. Party leader, Geert Wilders has also attended ID Party events and appears in its promotional material. The Blue Party led by former AfD leader, Frauke Petry and the UK Independence Party, then led by Gerard Batten, were both members of the ENF. Both the Blue Party and UKIP never became official members of MENF however were ideologically aligned.

ID Party leaders also have public political relations of some kind with Brothers of Italy (FdI, Italy). On 24 October 2015, MENF's leader and vice-president of the National Rally Louis Aliot met the current president of Brothers of Italy, Giorgia Meloni in Trieste for a conference on immigration. Also in 2015 Marine Le Pen praised SVP's victory during the 2015 Swiss election although the Swiss party does not have official links with the movement. The movement launched an anti-immigration campaign in 2015 just like the SVP's campaign during Swiss referendum on immigration in 2014. In February 2017, French MEP Edouard Ferrand met with Vox's leaders during a meeting of the Spanish right-wing party. Back in 2016, Vox's president Santiago Abascal had already met with one of the National Rally's leaders, Louis Aliot, also one of MENF's MEP in the European Parliament.

ID Party have supported the Visegrád Group of Poland, Hungary, Czech Republic and Slovakia for their opposition to the European Union's migrant policies in response to the European migrant crisis. ID Party have launched a petition to support the ruling parties of these nations. Law and Justice and Fidesz have expressed populist and anti-immigrant rhetoric similar to members of ID Party, resulting in mutual support, especially from Viktor Orbán and his party. Matteo Salvini and Marine Le Pen hoped to forge strong relations with Law and Justice and Fidesz prior to the 2019 European Parliament election. From July 2021 to January 2022, most ID Party members participated in a series of declarations and summits alongside Fidesz, Law and Justice, Vox, Greek Solution and other European nationalist parties.

In 2022, Fidesz sent representatives, including Justice Minister Judit Varga, to address ID Party events.

Structure

President
 Gerolf Annemans  (VB, Belgium)

Members of the Bureau
 Jordan Bardella  (RN, France) 
 Harald Vilimsky  (FPÖ, Austria)
 Marco Zanni  (Lega, Italy)
 Angelo Ciocca  (Lega, Italy)
 Jaak Madison  (EKRE, Estonia)

Treasurer
 Jean-François Jalkh  (RN, France)

References

2014 establishments in the European Union
Eurosceptic parties
Pan-European political parties
Right-wing politics in Europe
Right-wing populism in Europe
Far-right politics in Europe
Right-wing populist parties